Waziri may refer to:

Vizier when rendered in the Hausa and Fula languages
Wazir (Pashtun tribe) from Waziristan
 Wazir (Khogyani clan) in southern Nangarhar Province, Afghanistan
 Waziri language, spoken by the Waziris of Waziristan
 Waziri (sheep), a breed of sheep originating in Waziristan
 Something or someone originating from Waziristan
 The family name of the Sokoto Grand Vizier 
 The family name of Farida Mzamber Waziri, Chairman of Nigeria's Economic and Financial Crimes Commission and mentioned in many scam emails
 Waziri (fictional tribe), a fictional African tribe in the Tarzan novels and their adaptions

See also
 Wazir (disambiguation)